Markus Kauczinski (born 20 February 1970) is a German football coach and manager of Wehen Wiesbaden.

Coaching career
Kauczinski started to coach Karlsruher SC II in May 2009 and continued in this role until March 2012 when he took over the senior squad. During his tenure as the reserve team head coach, he had three stints as interim head coach of the senior squad, the first of which happened from August 2009 to September 2009 when Karlsruhe hired Markus Schupp as their new head coach. Kauczinski's second stint happened from October 2010 to November 2010, ending only due to Kauczinski not having the required coaching license. His final stint as interim head coach happened from October 2011 to 6 November 2011 when Karlsruhe hired Jørn Andersen.

After four years as Karlsruhe's head coach, he took over FC Ingolstadt 04 for the 2016–17 Bundesliga season but was fired after scoring only two points in ten games. Next, Kauczinski was appointed as head coach of FC St. Pauli on 7 December 2017, staying in this position until being sacked on 10 April 2019. He was installed as head coach of Dynamo Dresden on 10 December 2019. After the club fell to fourth place, Kauczinski was sacked in April 2021.

In November 2021, he was signed by Wehen Wiesbaden.

Managerial statistics

References

External links

KSC-Trainer Markus Kauczinski im Interview, spox.com, 5 April 2016

1970 births
Living people
Sportspeople from Gelsenkirchen
German football managers
Karlsruher SC managers
2. Bundesliga managers
Bundesliga managers
FC Ingolstadt 04 managers
3. Liga managers
FC St. Pauli managers
Dynamo Dresden managers
SV Wehen Wiesbaden managers